The Jeux des îles (English: Games of the islands) is an annual multi-sport event for youth athletes from the 23 member countries of the association of  (COJI).

Participants
In the fourteen editions, the number of participating islands has changed from edition to edition, as delegations are not required to attend the event. There are, however, 23 islands registered at the COJI that have participated in at least one edition.

 
  
  
  
  
  Corfu
  
 
  Elba
  
  
  
 
  
  Korčula
 
  
   Martinique
   Mayotte
  
   Réunion
  Sardinia
  Sicily

Editions

References

External links
 COJI official website 
 Jeux des iles 2020

Recurring sporting events established in 1997
European international sports competitions
Youth sports competitions
Multi-sport events in Europe